Alex Ahrendtsen (born 14 February 1967 in Kolding) is a Danish politician, who is a member of the Folketing for the Danish People's Party. He was elected into parliament at the 2011 Danish general election.

Political career
Ahrendtsen was in the municipal council of Odense Municipality from 2006 to 2017. He was first elected into the Folketing in the 2011 general election, where he received 2,462 personal votes. He was reelected in the 2015 election with 4,996 personal votes, and again in the 2019 election with 2,656 personal votes.

References

External links 
 Biography on the website of the Danish Parliament (Folketinget)

Living people
1967 births
People from Kolding
Danish People's Party politicians
Danish municipal councillors
Members of the Folketing 2011–2015
Members of the Folketing 2015–2019
Members of the Folketing 2019–2022
Members of the Folketing 2022–2026